Frank Cannella (born October 15, 1957) is a businessman and philanthropist, known for his work in the infomercial industry. In 1999 People Magazine labeled him as a pioneer in the infomercial industry and in April 2013 Cannella was inducted into the Direct Response Television Hall of Fame. Cannella formed Cannella Response Television, which handled the 1990s Tae Bo exercise video infomercials advertising campaign.

Career
In the 1980s Cannella worked with a Chicago advertising agency and focused his career predominantly on infomercials after completing a 1982 infomercial through the Chicago agency. He relocated to Burlington, Wisconsin and in 1984, formed Cannella Response Television. The company is headquartered in Burlington, Wisconsin. Cannella is an active philanthropist and public servant, working on projects such as providing Christmas gifts for challenged children.
In 2006 Cannella won a Bravo! Entrepreneur Award for his work with Cannella Response Television.

References

External links
 Cannella Response Television
 Cannella Media

American advertising executives
1957 births
Living people